Lokopriya Gopinath Bordoloi Regional Institute of Mental Health (লোকপ্ৰিয় গোপীনাথ বৰদলৈ আঞ্চলিক মানসিক স্বাস্থ্য প্ৰতিষ্ঠান) is one of the oldest mental health care institutes in India established in the year 1876. It is located in Tezpur in Sonitpur district of  Assam. The Institute is spread over 81 acres of land.

Location
Lokpriya Gopinath Bordoloi Regional Institute of Mental Health (LGBRIMH) is located in Tezpur. It is connected by road, rail and air to other  parts of the country. The Institute is located about 2 km away from the ASTC Bus Stand, Tezpur. It is about 180 km away from Guwahati.
The Tezpur Airport at Salonibari is about 15 km away from the Institute.

History
The Lokopriya Gopinath Bordoloi Regional Institute of Mental Health (LGBRIMH) was initially set up as
Tezpur Lunatic Asylum under the British Government in April, 1876.
In 1922 the hospital was renamed as Tezpur Mental Hospital. The hospital accommodation rose up to 700 beds in 1932.
After the Independence, the hospital was brought under the Government of Assam. In 1949, Late Dr. N. C. Bordoloi became the Superintendent of the hospital. During his tenure, the hospital saw marked improvement in the administration and treatment services. Dr. Bordoloi was the first psychiatrist in the country to receive the Padmashree Award from the Government of India for his dedicated service.
A new Out-Patient Department (OPD) was built in 1987. In the following year, another two storied building was built to accommodate the increased number of patients.  In 1989, the hospital was renamed as Lokopriya Gopinath Bordoloi Institute of Mental Health on the name of first chief minister of Assam Gopinath Bordoloi .
In 1999 the Institute was handed over to the North Eastern Council (NEC). 
On 1 June 2007, the Institute was taken over by the Ministry of Health and Family Welfare (India), Government of India.

Academics

Department of Psychiatry
Department of Psychiatry established in 1998. Residency Scheme of Government of India was started in this Institute from 2001.
The Department started the DNB course in 2006 and MD course in 2010. It has regular structured teaching programmes for the trainees as per guidelines approved by the National Board of Examinations (NBE), Medical Council of India (MCI) and Gauhati University. The faculties also provide medico-legal services and act in cooperation with the District Disability Rehabilitation Centre (DDRC), Tezpur for certification of disability.

Courses Offered:
MD (Psychiatry) 11 seats through NEET PG

Department of Psychiatric Nursing
Department of Psychiatric Nursing was started in the year 1998. In 2001, the Diploma in Psychiatric Nursing (DPN) was started under the Nursing Council of India and State Nursing Council. In 2007, the M. Sc Nursing (Psychiatric Nursing) course was introduced for the first time in the NER of India under Srimanta Sankaradeva University of Health Sciences. Mrs. Arunjyoti Baruah, HOD  of Department of Psychiatric Nursing received the  Florence Nightingale Award from the President of India in 2009.

Course Offered :
Diploma in Psychiatric Nursing (DPN)
The candidate should have a certificate in General Nursing and Midwifery or B.Sc. Nursing.
Should be a Registered Nurse in the State Nursing Council with one year of working experience.
 M. Sc (Psychiatric Nursing)
 B.Sc Nursing / Post basic B.Sc Nursing degree from any university recognised by the Nursing Council of India.
Should be a registered nurse with minimum one year of working experience.

Department of Clinical Psychology
The Department of Clinical Psychology was set up in the year 2002. The M.Phil course in Clinical Psychology was introduced in 2011 under affiliation to Gauhati University.
Course Offered: 
M. Phil in Clinical Psychology(2 years full-time)
Minimum educational qualification for admission to this course will be M.A./M.Sc. degree in Psychology/Counseling Psychology/ Clinical Psychology/Applied Psychology from UGC approved University/Institutions securing not less than 55% marks in aggregate. However, there will be relaxation of 5% on the aggregate marks obtained in the qualifying examination for SC/ST candidates.

Department of Psychiatric Social Work

The Department of Psychiatric Social Work was started in 1998 with the objective of starting social work services and teaching programs in psychiatric social work. The M. Phil course in Psychiatric Social Work was introduced in 2009 under affiliation to Gauhati University.

Course Offered :M. Phil (Psychiatric Social Work)
Masters in Social Work (MSW) or M.A. in Arts in Social Work from a UGC approved University / Institution securing not less than 55% marks in the aggregate, with or without specialization in Medical & Psychiatric Social Work. However, there will be relaxation of 5% on the aggregate marks obtained in the qualifying examination for SC/ST candidates.

Department of Pathology & Microbiology
Department of Pathology & Microbiology was started in the year 1999. All necessary investigations of the hospital are undertaken through this department.

Department of Biochemistry
Department of Biochemistry in the institute was started in the year 1999 with the goal to achieve overall quality in teaching and patient care services.

The Department of Radiology
The Department of Radiology was started in the year 1999 as a specialized, full-fledged department to meet the clinical needs in diagnostic imaging and image-guided therapies of the institute. Currently, the Department has a modern CT Scan machine, a mobile X- Ray machine and a Color Doppler Ultrasonic machine for the purpose. The process of installation of Digital X-Ray machine is under way.

Department of Anaesthesiology
Since the year 1954, only direct form of Electro-Convulsive Therapy was administered to patients. The full-fledged Department of Anaesthesiology was started in the year 2003 following the purchase of computerized Electro-Convulsive Therapy machine and Boyle’s apparatus. Modified ECT was introduced in the year 2004.

References

Organizations established in 1876
Mental health in India
Research institutes in Assam
1876 establishments in India